Palau Micronesia Air was an airline based in Palau. It operated services under the Air New Zealand air operators certificate. It suspended operations in December 2004.

History 
The airline was established in September 2002. In October 2003 Air New Zealand reached an understanding with Palau Micronesia Air committing to provide a range of support services for the new company, including operating its aircraft under the Air New Zealand air operators certificate. Operations started on 5 August 2004. It suspended operations on 23 December 2004, attributing it to high costs and under-performing sales.

Services 
It served Palau, Guam, Saipan, Micronesia, Australia and the Philippines. It was the first airline to provide direct service between Palau and Australia.

References 

Defunct airlines of Palau
Airlines established in 2002
Airlines disestablished in 2004
2002 establishments in Palau